Yenikışla may refer to the following places in Turkey:

 Yenikışla, Kumluca, a village in the district of Kumluca, Antalya Province
 Yenikışla, Ulus, a village in the district of Ulus, Bartın Province